Casteless may refer to:

of an individual, an outcaste
of a society, an egalitarian society without caste structure